The term Maleševo-Pirin dialect  (also spelt Maleshevo) is used in South Slavic linguistics to refer to a group of related varieties that are spoken on both sides of the border of Bulgaria and the Republic of North Macedonia. Some linguists treat them as dialects of the Bulgarian language, while Victor Friedman views them as part of Macedonian. According to some authors, they are linguistically transitional between the two national languages, Bulgarian and Macedonian and form part of the larger dialect continuum between them. The dialect group is named after the mountain ranges of Pirin in Bulgaria and Maleševo in Macedonia. When referring specifically to the dialects on the Bulgarian side, the term Petrich-Blagoevgrad dialect, after the two major towns in the area, is also used.

Macedonian linguists tend to treat the whole group as part of Macedonian, classifying it as part of a southeastern group of Macedonian dialects,  whereas from the perspective of Bulgarian linguistics, the varieties in Bulgaria and North Macedonia are classified as parts of the eastern subgroup of the southwestern group of Bulgarian.
This dialect is spoken in the towns of Delčevo, Pehčevo, Berovo and the surrounding villages in the east of the Republic of Macedonia,
and in the regions of Blagoevgrad, Petrich and Sandanski in Bulgaria.

The Blagoevgrad-Petric dialect is also closely related to the neighbouring Kyustendil and Samokov dialects, and especially to the Dupnitsa dialect,
whereas the Maleshevo dialect is closely related especially with the Strumica dialect.

Linguistic properties

The following is a table of distinctive phonological and grammatical features, comparing the values found in the Maleshevo and Blagoevgrad-Petrich dialects with Standard Bulgarian, Standard Macedonian and two neighbouring Western Bulgarian dialect areas.

As shown by the table, the Maleshevo and the Blagoevgrad-Petrich dialect show mixed Bulgarian and Macedonian phonological traits and mostly Bulgarian grammatical traits (several instead of one conjugation, single definite article, formation of past perfect tense with бeх, etc.), with the Maleshevo dialect ranging mostly towards Macedonian and the Blagoevgrad-Petrich dialect ranging mostly towards Bulgarian (cf. table). The transitional nature of the dialect is further demonstrated by the reflexes of the Proto-Slavic /: from the typically Bulgarian щ/жд (/) in the Blagoevgrad-Petrich dialect and the far East of the Maleshevo dialect, along the border with Bulgaria, through the transitional шч/жџ (/) in the central parts, and to the typically Macedonian ќ/ѓ (/) in the western parts of the Maleshevo dialect

Other phonological characteristics
 shortening of words
 use of the old consonant group caf- instead of the consonant group cv-: цев- цаф (cev, 'pipe')

Morphological characteristics
 use of the preposition sos: – сос рака ('with the hand');
 the clitic possessive forms follow the verb: му рече – рече му ('He told him');
 use of the dative form with na: на нас ни рече ( na nas ni reche, 'He told us')
 the form of the verb to be for third person plural is sa as in Bulgarian, instead of se as in Macedonian: тие се – тие/тия са ('those are'), они са ('they are')
 use of the pronouns on, ona, ono, oni (он, она, оно, они) instead of toj, tja, to, te

References

Dialects of the Bulgarian language
Dialects of the Macedonian language
Blagoevgrad Province
Pehčevo Municipality
Delčevo Municipality
Berovo Municipality